The 1948 Vanderbilt Commodores football team represented Vanderbilt University during the 1948 college football season.  This was Red Sanders's last season as the Commodores' head coach.  Vanderbilt lost their first game of the season to Georgia Tech, tied their second with Alabama, and then lost the next to Mississippi, who finished the season 8–1.  Vanderbilt won the last eight games of the season, which ties as the school's second longest and remained the longest win streak for the program until a seven-game streak to end the 2012 season.  The 1948 Vanderbilt team outscored their opponents 328 to 73 and posted four shutouts.  The Commodores played only four home games at Dudley Field in Nashville, Tennessee. Lee Nalley broke the record for punt return yardage.

Schedule

References

Vanderbilt
Vanderbilt Commodores football seasons
Vanderbilt Commodores football